The NCAA Division I women's volleyball tournament is an annual event that leads to the championship in women's volleyball from teams in Division I contested by the NCAA each winter since 1981. Texas won the most recent tournament, defeating Louisville 3–0 at CHI Health Center Omaha in Omaha, Nebraska.

History
From 1970 through 1980, before the NCAA governed women's collegiate athletics, the Association for Intercollegiate Athletics for Women conducted the women's collegiate volleyball championships.

Volleyball was one of twelve women's sports added to the NCAA championship program for the 1981–82 school year, as the NCAA engaged in battle with the AIAW for sole governance of women's collegiate sports. The AIAW continued to conduct its established championship program in the same twelve (and other) sports; however, after a year of dual women's championships, the NCAA won the fight and assumed the AIAW's authority and membership.

The first NCAA championship tournament was held in 1981, with 20 schools competing for the title. The tournament expanded gradually, moving to 28 teams in 1982, 32 in 1986, 48 in 1993, 56 in 1997, and finally to its current size of 64 in 1998.

There is also an NCAA Men's National Collegiate Volleyball Championship, which until 2012 was open to members of all three NCAA divisions,, as there are far fewer men's programs than women's. However, starting in the 2011–12 school year (2011 women's season, 2012 men's season), a Division III championship was established. The National Collegiate championship now involves only Division I and II members; under NCAA rules, D-II schools can compete under D-I rules in any sport that does not have a dedicated D-II national championship.

Champions
The following is a list of Division I champions and runners-up with the champion's overall record, city, site and other national semifinal participants. 
See Association for Intercollegiate Athletics for Women championships for the Division I volleyball champions from 1970 to 1981.  NOTE:  In 1981 there were both NCAA and AIAW champions.

Statistics

Team titles

Champions by decade

1980s

1990s

2000s

2010s

2020s

Winners of two or more consecutive championships

Common Matchups in Championship Final

Champions by state

Final 4 Appearances

Current Conference Key

Records 
 Highest attendance: 18,755 (2021 championship match)
 Lowest attendance for a championship match: 0 (2020)
 Lowest seed to win championship: 11 (Stanford, 2004)
 Lowest seed in championship game: Unseeded (BYU, 2014)
 Most championships: Stanford (9)
 Most consecutive championships: Penn State (4, 2007–10)
 Most consecutive postseason victories: Penn State (26)
 Most championships by a head coach: Russ Rose (7)
 Most championships by conference: Pac-12 (17)
 Most appearances in championship match: Stanford (17)
 Most semifinal appearances: Stanford (23)
 Most semifinal appearances without a championship: Florida (8)
 Undefeated seasons (since 1981): Long Beach State (1998), Nebraska (2000), USC (2003), Penn State (2008, 2009)

Most Outstanding Player 
In 1991 and now annually since 1996, the NCAA has awarded the most outstanding player(s) of the NCAA championship.

See also
AIAW Intercollegiate Women's Volleyball Champions
NAIA Volleyball Championship
NCAA men's volleyball tournament (National Collegiate division)
NCAA Division II women's volleyball tournament
NCAA Division III men's volleyball tournament
NCAA Division III women's volleyball tournament
American Volleyball Coaches Association (AVCA)

References

External links
  NCAA Division I Women's Volleyball

Volleyball
 
NCAA Women's Vol
USA